Zhao Shuai (born 15 August 1995) is a Chinese taekwondo practitioner. He won gold medals at the 2016 Olympics and 2017 World Championships, placing third earlier in 2015. He served as the flag bearer for China at the opening ceremony of the 2018 Asian Games, where he later won a silver medal.

Zhao took up taekwondo in 2006. He has a degree in physical education from the Southwest University.

In 2019, he won the gold medal in the men's bantamweight event at the 2019 World Taekwondo Championships in Manchester, United Kingdom.

Personal life
Zhao was born on 15 August 1995 in Changzhou in the province of Jiangsu.

His spouse was also an Olympic champion in Rio 2016, Zheng Shuyin.

References

External links

1995 births
Living people
Sportspeople from Jiangsu
Athletes from Jiangsu
People from Changzhou
Sportspeople from Changzhou
Chinese male taekwondo practitioners
Olympic taekwondo practitioners of China
Taekwondo practitioners at the 2016 Summer Olympics
Medalists at the 2016 Summer Olympics
Olympic gold medalists for China
Olympic medalists in taekwondo
Taekwondo practitioners at the 2014 Asian Games
Southwest University alumni
Universiade medalists in taekwondo
Taekwondo practitioners at the 2018 Asian Games
Medalists at the 2018 Asian Games
Asian Games medalists in taekwondo
Asian Games silver medalists for China
Universiade silver medalists for China
World Taekwondo Championships medalists
Asian Taekwondo Championships medalists
Medalists at the 2015 Summer Universiade
Taekwondo practitioners at the 2020 Summer Olympics
Olympic bronze medalists for China
Medalists at the 2020 Summer Olympics
21st-century Chinese people